William Jenkins Rees (10 January 1772 – 18 January 1855) was a Welsh cleric and antiquary.

Life
The son of Rees Rees of Llan Dingad, Carmarthenshire, he was born in the parish. He was educated at Carmarthen grammar school, and on 12 April 1791 matriculated at Wadham College, Oxford. He graduated B.A. in 1795 and M.A. in 1797.

Taking holy orders, Rees first obtained the curacy of Stoke-Edith and Westhide, Herefordshire; and in 1807 the rectory of Casgob, Radnorshire, where he spent the rest of his life. In 1820 he was made a prebendary of Christ College, Brecon, and in 1840 a fellow of the Society of Antiquaries of London.

Rees died on 18 January 1855.

Works
Rees is best known for the editorual work he did for the Welsh Manuscripts Society. The society's edition of the Liber Landavensis was transferred on the death of his nephew Rice Rees to him in 1839, and the book appeared in 1840. In 1853 Rees also edited for the society Lives of the Cambro-British Saints (text and English translation). Both of these works were subject to later criticism.

In 1803 Rees published A Short and Practical Account of the Principal Doctrines of Christianity, in 1809 an essay on Clerical Elocution, and in 1811 a tract on pastoral work.

Notes

Attribution

1772 births
1855 deaths
19th-century Welsh Anglican priests
Welsh antiquarians
Fellows of the Society of Antiquaries of London
People from Carmarthenshire
Alumni of Wadham College, Oxford